Qolañğı is a rural locality (a posyolok) in Qaybıç District, Tatarstan. The population was 339 as of 2010.

Geography 
Qolañğı is located 17 km northeast of Olı Qaybıç, district's administrative centre, and 91 km southwest of Qazan, republic's capital, by road.

History 
The village was established in 1943. Until 1963 was a part of Qaybıç District. After 1963 in Bua (1963–1964),  Apas (1964–1991) and Qaybıç districts.

References

External links 
 

Rural localities in Kaybitsky District